The impression of depth in The Lord of the Rings is an aesthetic effect deliberately sought by its author, J. R. R. Tolkien. It was intended to give the reader the feeling that the work had "deep roots in the past", and hence that it was attractively authentic.

The effect was constructed on at least four factors, namely the enormous scale of The Lord of the Rings and the amount of background detail, including maps and genealogies; the apparently casual and incomplete mentions of this background; multiple inconsistent accounts, as in real history; and writing different texts in varying styles.

Scholars have noted some of Tolkien's medieval antecedents in the effect, such as Beowulf and Sir Gawain and the Green Knight. Fantasy authors such as Ursula K. Le Guin and J. K. Rowling have to an extent followed Tolkien in using the technique.

Effect

In an essay, Tolkien praised the 14th-century English chivalric romance Sir Gawain and the Green Knight for its "deep roots in the past, deeper even than its author was aware". In his opinion, this enabled it to survive even the severe test of being a set text for students; it deserved "close and detailed attention, and after that ... careful consideration, and re-consideration". In an aside, he went on to discuss what that meant:

In a letter, Tolkien provided at least part of his own view of the impression of depth in The Lord of the Rings, namely that

Tolkien noted further that this effect would be difficult to attain in the legendarium that lay behind The Lord of the Rings, "unless new unattainable vistas are again revealed". He added that "many of the older legends are purely 'mythological', and nearly all are grim and tragic".

The scholar of English literature Katarzyna Ferdynus comments that

Tom Shippey, a Tolkien scholar, writes that depth is "the one literary quality, to say no more, which most certainly distinguishes Tolkien from his many imitators", and that behind the visible text lay "a coherent, consistent, deeply fascinating world about which he had no time [then] to speak".

Precedents

This quality of depth, that Tolkien valued highly, he found especially in Beowulf, but also in other works that he admired, such as Virgil's Aeneid, Shakespeare's Macbeth, Sir Orfeo, and Grimms' Fairy Tales. Scholars such as Gergely Nagy have identified other texts well known to Tolkien that provide a strong impression of depth, including Thomas Malory's Morte d'Arthur and Geoffrey Chaucer's Troilus and Criseyde. Beowulf contains numerous digressions into other stories which have functions other than advancing the story, in Adrien Bonjour's words rendering "the background of the poem extraordinarily alive", and providing contrasts and examples that repeatedly illuminate the key points of the main story. Tolkien stated in The Monsters and the Critics that Beowulf

Factors

Scholars have identified four factors that help to build the impression of depth:

 the enormous scale and detail of Tolkien's Middle-earth background
 the apparently casual and incomplete mentions of this background in the text, as if it were something taken for granted
 the multiple accounts, containing gaps and inconsistencies, as if it were a real body of historical documents
 the multiple styles in which the various texts are written, as if by different hands.

Vast backcloths

Tolkien alluded to the first factor with the phrase "vast backcloths":

The Tolkien scholar Michael Drout, with colleagues, notes that the vastness was not an exaggeration, given that it encompassed The Silmarillion and much of the multi-volume legendarium edited by  Tolkien's son Christopher, not to mention the many "further drafts, partially edited copies, riders, cancelled pages, and even lost texts" behind even those lengthy works. Shippey adds that Tolkien's maps, too, lend an "air of solidity and extent" to the work, providing "repeated implicit assurances of the existence of the things they label, and of course of their nature and history too".

Casual mentions

Mentions of background stories and events in The Lord of the Rings take many forms. These include songs and poems interspersed in the text, such as of Beren and Lúthien sung by Aragorn; mentions of objects like the prized Silmarils, by the Hobbit Sam Gamgee; and people from past ages like the Elven-smith Celebrimbor, described by the Elf-lord Elrond. All these mentions made use of existing but at the time unpublished texts. Similarly, the lady of Rohan, Éowyn, does not just give Merry Brandybuck a horn; she gives him an ancient silver horn "from the Hoard of Scatha the Worm". The mentions give the reader the feeling that Middle-earth is far larger than the parts described in the story, and that it had "a deep history" much older than the War of the Ring. 

Nagy analyses the effect of such mentions in the case of Sam's fight with the giant spider Shelob during his and Frodo's dangerous struggle to enter the Dark Lord Sauron's evil land of Mordor. Sam desperately slashes at Shelob's underside after she has stung Frodo:

The invocation of the First Age hero Túrin Turambar, Nagy writes, "becomes a reflection of Túrin slaying Glaurung" the dragon. He states that Glaurung's allegiance to the original Dark Lord, Morgoth, reinforces the link with evil already suggested by the descent of Shelob from the first and greatest of all the evil giant spiders, Ungoliant, who destroyed the Two Trees of Valinor in The Silmarillion, and that Túrin's feud with the dragon is mirrored by Sam's feud with the spider, begun by its attack on Sam's master, Frodo. Nagy comments that "the dimension of the scene is [thus] greatly increased".

Multiple accounts, apparent contradictions

Scholars such as Peri Sipahi note that the use of multiple accounts is introduced in the Prologue to The Lord of the Rings, where the narrator explains that "many of their traditions, up to that time still mainly oral, were collected and written down", and then details the various copies, redactions, and translations that were made of the fictive Red Book of Westmarch. Beowulf is similarly written as if its audience knew of the historic characters already. The Poetic Edda is a compilation of numerous older sources.

Apparent contradictions, Drout notes, tend to give readers the impression of a real and complex history, since they may assume that an omniscient author can make a fictional story wholly consistent. Among the examples he gives are that Tolkien stated that Elves rode without either a saddle or a harness, but the Elf-lord Glorfindel's horse is described as having both bit and bridle, and Glorfindel says he will shorten his horse's stirrups for the Hobbit Frodo. In another case, Tolkien intentionally did not edit away the contradiction between Tom Bombadil's claim that he was "Eldest ... here before the river and the trees; Tom remembers the first raindrop and the first acorn", and Gandalf's description of the Ent Treebeard that "Treebeard is Fangorn, the guardian of the forest; he is the oldest of the Ents, the oldest living thing that still walks beneath the Sun upon this Middle-earth".

Varying styles

The characters from each part of Middle-earth speak and act in a way that is characteristic of that place, as with the Rohirrim. Sipahi notes, too, that all four factors tend to occur together, again as seen in the account of the Rohirrim. In addition, their language and names—all taken from Old English—lend further depth by linking back to the medieval period in the real primary world.

Reception 

The critic and experimental novelist Christine Brooke-Rose attacked "the histories and genealogies" as not "in the least necessary to the narrative", thus demonstrating in Shippey's view her ignorance of Tolkien's creation of depth. He notes that she guessed wrongly that Tolkien would have translated all the "runic and other messages inside the narrative", as, he suggests, almost all other authors would have done, but that Tolkien did not, as he saw a value in the sound of untranslated language.

Later fantasy authors such as Ursula K. Le Guin made use of the device of giving pseudo-references to create depth; in the Earthsea novels, she alluded to tales of Elfarran, Morred, and the Firelord, which she wrote many years later. The scholar Katherine Sas writes that J. K. Rowling scaled down Tolkien's impression of depth but applied all four factors involved to her Harry Potter book The Prisoner of Azkaban.

Notes

References

Primary 
This list identifies each item's location in Tolkien's writings.

Secondary

Sources 

 
 
 
 
 
 
 
 
 
 
 
 
 

Middle-earth
Themes of The Lord of the Rings